Tu Jhoothi Main Makkaar abbreviated as TJMM, is a 2023 Indian Hindi-language romantic comedy film directed by Luv Ranjan and written by Rahul Mody, Luv Ranjan. Produced by Luv Films and T-Series Films, it stars  Ranbir Kapoor and Shraddha Kapoor in lead roles, with Anubhav Singh Bassi, Dimple Kapadia and Boney Kapoor (in his acting debut) in supporting roles. It marked Shraddha Kapoor's return to the big screen after three years.

Tu Jhoothi Main Makkaar theatrically released on 8 March 2023, coinciding with the Holi weekend. The film received mixed-to-positive reviews from critics, who praised the direction, performances (particularly leads), soundtrack, humour, emotional weight and cinematography. However, criticism was leveled at the formulaic first half. Tu Jhoothi Main Makkaar has grossed over  worldwide, the second highest by a Hindi film in 2023.

Plot 
Rohan 'Mickey' Arora is the son of Ramesh Arora, a rich Punjabi business magnate, and lives with his family in Delhi. He along with his best friend, Manu Dabbas, secretly work as break-up consultants, helping people break-up with their respective partners. Mickey and Manu travel to Spain for Manu's bachelor party. They are accompanied by Manu's fiancèe, Kinchi, along with her best friend, Nisha 'Tinni' Malhotra. Mickey and Tinni hook up and eventually fall in love with each other. Upon returning, Manu and Kinchi get married, while Mickey and Tinni introduce each other to their respective families. Both the families accept their relationship and start preparations for their wedding. However, Tinni feels she is not ready for the marriage and decides to breakup with Mickey. Tinni contacts the break-up consultant on phone, not knowing that it is in fact Mickey, and asks for help in breaking up with him. Unaware that he is speaking with Tinni, Mickey agrees to help. 

Mickey suggests that Tinni and her partner match each other's horoscopes, and if they do not align, then the marriage can be called off. However, their horoscopes align perfectly, and the plan fails. Mickey soon finds out that the client is none other than Tinni and is heartbroken as she did not discuss her concerns with him and try to sort out the misunderstandings. He decides to play along and beat Tinni at her own game. He suggests Tinni to do a "jealousy test", which can lead to their breakup. Tinni hires a guy to act as an old friend of hers and dances seductively with him in front of Mickey. But Mickey pretends to not notice and remains unaffected. Next, Mickey suggests to do a "loyalty test" and Tinni hires a girl to seduce Mickey and if he cheats on her, then she could easily breakup with him. But Mickey does not give in and acts as a loyal partner, failing this plan as well. 

Posing as the break-up consultant on phone, Mickey asks Tinni the reason for breaking up with him. Tinni reveals that she does not want to live with his family after marriage and wants to live independently, so that they can have their own personal space. Knowing that Mickey loves his family dearly and not wanting to make him choose between her and his family, she wants to breakup with him. Mickey does not want to leave his family for her, and decides to go ahead with breaking off the marriage. He suggests to Tinni to say that she has received a job offer in Bengaluru and that she would permanently move there after marriage. Going by the plan, she tells this to Mickey and he angrily lashes out at her, saying that she should have discussed it with him beforehand, as this is not acceptable to him. Their marriage is broken off and they part ways. 

Sometime later, they meet again at Kinchi's baby shower. Tinni's foot is injured while dancing at the function and Mickey along with his family care for her, which makes her realize the value of living together as a family. Mickey's niece Chhoti, while talking to Tinni, blurts out a unique phrase that she heard from Mickey that causes Tinni to realize that the breakup consultant was in fact Mickey. She confronts him about it and says that she is disappointed as even after knowing the truth, he did not try to sort out the matter with her and that she still loves him. She says that she would be permanently leaving for London and heads to the airport. Mickey's family advises him to not let her go by compromising his love for them. Mickey, along with his whole family rush to the airport to stop Tinni and reach her just as she is about to board the flight. She tries to make Mickey take the oath he made her take and then Mickey proposes to her to marry Mickey and she accepts. They both get married and live happily together as a family.

Cast 
 Ranbir Kapoor as Rohan 'Mickey' Arora
 Shraddha Kapoor as Nisha 'Tinni' Malhotra
 Anubhav Singh Bassi as Manu Dabbas
 Dimple Kapadia as Renu Arora, Mickey's mother
 Boney Kapoor as Ramesh Arora, Mickey's father
 Hasleen Kaur as Minny, Mickey's sister
 Amber Rana as Ashish, Mickey's brother-in-law
 Monica Chaudhary as Kinchi Dabbas, Manu's wife
 Inayat Verma as Sweetu, Mickey's niece
 Jatinder Kaur as Mrs. Arora, Mickey's grandmother
 Rajesh Jais as Mr. Malhotra, Tinni's father
 Ayesha Raza Mishra as Mrs. Malhotra, Tinni's mother
 Kartik Aaryan as Rahul (cameo appearance)
 Nushrat Bharucha as Anya 'Anu' (cameo appearance)

Production

Development 
The film was officially announced as an untitled romantic comedy on 20 December 2019. The first release date of the film was set to be on 26 March 2021. Due to the COVID-19 pandemic, the release date was shifted to 18 March 2022. Yet again, due to the delay in filming, the release date was shifted to 26 January 2023, thus coinciding with the Indian Republic Day. The final release date was then decided to be 8 March 2023, concurring with the festival of Holi.

Casting 
Ranbir Kapoor and Shraddha Kapoor were cast as the leads, marking their first project together. Dimple Kapadia and producer Boney Kapoor (in his acting debut) were cast as Ranbir's parents. It also marked the acting debut of stand-up comedian Anubhav Singh Bassi and the Hindi film debut of actress Monica Chaudhary. Hasleen Kaur confirmed her presence in the film in January 2023.

Filming 
Filming began on 8 January 2021 in Ghaziabad with Ranbir and Shraddha. In July 2021, the second schedule of the film commenced in Delhi. The third schedule began in August 2021 in Mumbai, followed by another schedule in November 2021 in Delhi. The next schedule again took place in Mumbai in March 2022. The next schedule took place in Spain and Mauritius in June 2022.

In July 2022, a song featuring Shraddha Kapoor and Ranbir Kapoor was to be shot, but production was stalled when a fire broke out at the film's set in Chitrakoot Grounds, Andheri. It led to the death of a crew member named Manish Devashi, while another man from the lighting department was injured. The song was shot after a few days. The film was wrapped up in August 2022.

Marketing 
Tu Jhoothi Main Makkaars title was released with an announcement video along with the first poster on 14 December 2022. The official trailer was released on 23 January 2023 in an event held in Mumbai. Against the norm, the two leads did not promote the film together.  The film had a special screening on 7 March 2023, a day before release.

Soundtrack 

The music of the film is composed by Pritam. All lyrics are written by Amitabh Bhattacharya.

The first single, titled "Tere Pyaar Mein", was released on 1 February 2023. The second single, titled "Pyaar Hota Kayi Baar Hai", was released on 10 February. The third single titled "Show Me The Thumka" was released on 21 February 2023. The fourth single titled "O Bedardeya" was released on 4 March 2023. The fifth single titled "Maine Pi Rakhi Hai" was released on 10 March 2023. The sixth single titled "Jaadui" was released on 11 March 2023.

Release

Theatrical 
The film was released on 8 March 2023, coinciding with the Holi festival.

Digital Rights 
Film's digital rights have been bought by Netflix.

Reception

Critical response 
Tu Jhoothi Main Makkaar received mixed-to-positive reviews from critics upon release, with praise for its direction, soundtrack, humour, cinematography, costumes and the performances of the leads. On the review aggregator website Rotten Tomatoes, the film has an approval rating of 45%, with an average score of 6.9/10, based on reviews from 9 critics. 

Taran Adarsh rated the film 4 out of 5 stars and termed the film as a "refreshing take on romance and relationship" and praised Ranjan's direction. Himesh Mankad of Pinkvilla rated the film 4 out of 5 stars and wrote "Ranbir-Shraddha’s love story celebrates family emotions with comedy". Akash Bhatnagar of Bollywood Bubble rated 4 stars out of 5 and stated the film is "all that a millennial romcom should be." Bollywood Hungama rated the film 4 out of 5 stars and wrote "Tu Jhoothi Main Makkaar is an entertaining ride that boasts of not just fine performances, expert direction, and chartbuster music".

Renuka Vyavahare of The Times of India gave the film a rating of 3.5 stars out of 5 and stated that the film has "humour and heart at the right place". Titas Chowdhury of News 18 rated the film 3.5 out of 5, termed the chemistry between the leads as "pappable and sizzling" and music as the "strong point of the film". Devesh Sharma of Filmfare rated the film 3.5 out of 5 stars and wrote "Watch Tu Jhoothi Main Makkaar for the fresh pairing of Ranbir and Shraddha and for its several comic moments. You laugh the most in the last 30 minutes. It’s infinitely better than his earlier products and let’s hope he continues to tread this newfound path". Tushar Joshi of India Today rated the film 3.5 out of 5 stars and wrote that the film's "latter half and peppy climax redeem its lazy first half and making it a worthy entertainer". 

Ganesh Aaglave of Firstpost rated the film 3.5 out of 5 stars and wrote "Luv Ranjan ticks all the right boxes again with Tu Jhoothi Main Makkaar. The exotic locations and chartbuster music add great value to the film. Special mention to the superb climax, which will leave a huge smile on your face while exiting the cinema hall. Ranbir hits the ball out of the park his expressive eyes, which speak volumes in each and every frame. Shraddha is terrific, and the chemistry between her and RK is lit". Abhimanyu Mathur of DNA India rated the film 3 out of 5 stars and wrote "Tu Jhoothi Main Makkaar is a fun watch, but only if you have the patience to sit through a first half that is hammied and walks a long and winding route, taking its own sweet time to arrive at any point. The film’s beating heart is Ranbir Kapoor. The man returns to the romantic comedy genre and owns the screen like he never left. He is smooth in the fun scenes, impactful in the emotional ones".

Monika Rawal Kukreja of Hindustan Times wrote "Tu Jhoothi Main Makkaar is your age-old love story packaged in a modern day setup. It is weird and problematic, but rendered in a funny manner which might hook you in. You may struggle to sit through the pre-interval, but things settle a bit after that. Definitely a one-time watch for entertaining performances and monologues". Sukanya Verma of Rediff rated the film 2.5 out of 5 stars and wrote "Tu Jhoothi Main Makkaar rejoices in this dated deceit and stays true to its director's trademark boy bias." Pratikshya Mishra of The Quint rated the film 2 out of 5 stars and wrote "Tu Jhoothi Main Makkaar doesn’t try to be more than it is advertised to be and at first sight; it can even be considered entertaining. However, once you start to peel apart the layers, its flaws are laid bare and one wonders if Bollywood will ever grow out of those tropes".

Shubhra Gupta from The Indian Express was critical towards the filming, giving it a 1.5 out of 5 stars rating, finding fault with the length of the film, misogynistic elements and worn-out jokes.  Saibal Chatterjee also gave the film a 1.5 out of 5 star rating in a review for NDTV, calling the film "...More farce than comedy...".

Box office 
 

Notes

References

External links 
 
 

Films featuring songs by Pritam
Films distributed by Yash Raj Films
T-Series (company) films
2020s Hindi-language films
Films shot in Delhi
Films set in Delhi
Films set in Gurugram
Films shot in Gurugram
Films set in Haryana
Films shot in Mauritius
Films shot in Spain
Indian romantic comedy films
Films directed by Luv ranjan